Amadeus I may refer to:

 Amadeus I, Count of Savoy (c. 975 – c. 1052), Count of Savoy
 Amadeus I of Geneva (1098–1178), Count of Geneva
 Amadeo I of Spain (1845–1890), King of Spain from 1870 to 1873